Aaron Edward-George Hayden (born 16 January 1997) is an English footballer who plays as a defender for Wrexham.

Career
Having spent four years at Chelsea's academy, Hayden left to become a scholar at Wolverhampton Wanderers aged 16.

He moved on a one-month loan to League Two Newport County on 5 August 2015, and made his senior debut on 8 August against Cambridge United. His loan period was extended by a further month but subsequently terminated on 16 September 2015. After a short loan spell at Hemel Hempstead Town, he was again sent out on loan, this time to Bromley, on 20 January 2017. However, just 8 days later, he returned to Wolves after picking up an injury in a behind-closed-doors friendly, failing to feature in a competitive fixture for the National League club.

At the end of the 2016/17 season, he signed a new contract with Wolves, keeping him at the club until at least 2018.

On 16 February 2018, Hayden was loaned out to Stourbridge until 17 March 2018. The deal was later extended at the end of the season. He then returned to Wolves, but in on 1 August 2018, he was once again loaned out to Stourbridge, this time until 2 January 2019. On 31 January 2019, the loan deal was extended once again, this time for the remainder of the 2018/19 campaign.

On 29 July 2019, Hayden joined Carlisle United on a one-year contract (with option) following a successful trial spell with the club.

Hayden joined Wrexham on 8 August 2021 for an undisclosed fee. The defender signed a three year deal at the Racecourse Ground.

Career statistics

Honours
Wrexham
FA Trophy runner-up: 2021–22

Individual
National League Team of the Year: 2021–22

References

External links

1997 births
Living people
Footballers from Croydon
English footballers
Association football defenders
Wolverhampton Wanderers F.C. players
Newport County A.F.C. players
Hemel Hempstead Town F.C. players
Bromley F.C. players
AFC Telford United players
Stourbridge F.C. players
Carlisle United F.C. players
Wrexham A.F.C. players
English Football League players
National League (English football) players
Northern Premier League players
Southern Football League players